The 2004 Bulldogs RLFC season was the 70th season in the club's history. Coached by Steve Folkes and captained by Steve Price, they competed in the NRL's 2004 Telstra Premiership, finishing the regular season 2nd (out of 15). The Bulldogs' goal-kicker Hazem El Masri was the competition's top point scorer as they went on to claim their 8th Premiership with a 16–13 win over the Sydney Roosters in the 2004 NRL Grand Final.

Match results

References

See also
List of Canterbury-Bankstown Bulldogs seasons

Canterbury-Bankstown Bulldogs seasons
Bulldogs RLFC season